The 1971–72 NCAA University Division men's basketball season began in December 1971, progressed through the regular season and conference tournaments, and concluded with the 1972 NCAA University Division basketball tournament championship game on March 25, 1972, at Los Angeles Memorial Sports Arena in Los Angeles, California. The UCLA Bruins won their eighth NCAA national championship with an 81–76 victory over the Florida State Seminoles.

Season headlines 

 UCLA went undefeated (30–0) and won its sixth NCAA championship in a row, eighth overall, and eighth in nine seasons. In the Pacific 8 Conference, it also won its sixth of what ultimately would be 13 consecutive conference titles.
 The national championship game was played on Saturday for the last time. It moved to Monday night in 1973.

Season outlook

Pre-season polls 

The Top 20 from the AP Poll and Coaches Poll during the pre-season.

Conference membership changes

Regular season

Conference winners and tournaments

Informal championships

Statistical leaders

Post-season tournaments

NCAA tournament

Final Four 

 Third Place – North Carolina 105, Louisville 91

National Invitation tournament

Semifinals & finals 

 Third Place – Jacksonville 83, St. John's 80

Awards

Consensus All-American teams

Major player of the year awards 

 Naismith Award: Bill Walton, UCLA
 Helms Player of the Year: Bill Walton, UCLA
 Associated Press Player of the Year: Bill Walton, UCLA
 UPI Player of the Year: Bill Walton, UCLA
 Oscar Robertson Trophy (USBWA): Bill Walton, UCLA
 Adolph Rupp Trophy: Bill Walton, UCLA
 Sporting News Player of the Year: Bill Walton, UCLA

Major coach of the year awards 

 Associated Press Coach of the Year: John Wooden, UCLA
 Henry Iba Award (USBWA): John Wooden, UCLA
 NABC Coach of the Year: John Wooden, UCLA
 UPI Coach of the Year: John Wooden, UCLA
 Sporting News Coach of the Year: John Wooden, UCLA

Other major awards 

 Frances Pomeroy Naismith Award (Best player under 6'0): Scott Martin, Oklahoma
 Robert V. Geasey Trophy (Top player in Philadelphia Big 5): Corky Calhoun, Penn, & Chris Ford, Villanova
 NIT/Haggerty Award (Top player in New York City metro area): Richie Garner, Manhattan, & Tom Sullivan, Fordham

Coaching changes 

A number of teams changed coaches during the season and after it ended.

References